Negomiru may refer to:
Negomiru River, a tributary of the Jilţ River in Romania
Negomir, a commune in Gorj County, Romania